Thomas James West (1855 – November 1916) was an English-born theatre entrepreneur. He toured stage companies in the USA, New Zealand and Australia and in 1908 established West's Pictures in Australia.

Over the next few years it became one of the most significant film exhibitors in Australia and New Zealand, eventually branching out into production. In 1912 this company merged with Australasian Films.

References

English theatre managers and producers
Australian film producers
English emigrants to Australia
1855 births
1916 deaths
19th-century English businesspeople
19th-century Australian businesspeople